Carol Leader (born 10 November 1950 in Colchester, Essex) is a former English theatrical and television actress, and senior psychoanalytic psychotherapist.

She played Barbara Charlton in Young at Heart from 1980 to 1981, and Sadie Tomkins in Casualty from 1988 to 1989, and has also been in Flambards, Sally Ann,  First and Last (1989), Peak Practice and 1992 TV series Kevin and Co. She has also appeared in UK television series including Late Starter, Tales of the Unexpected, The Bill and The Knock. She is perhaps best known, however, to those who were young children in the 1970s and 1980s as a presenter of long-running UK children's TV series Play School, and children's TV show Chock-A-Block, which she co-presented with fellow former Play School host Fred Harris.

Leader's acting career began at the University of York where she studied History and feature in drama productions, including the role of Charlotte Corday in Y.U.D.S. Marat-Sade production in 1971.

Despite a successful stage and television career, Leader eventually quit acting and now works as a psychoanalytic psychotherapist in Ealing, London, and is a senior member of the Association for Group and Individual Psychotherapy and a senior associate of Management Training Company, Maynard Leigh Associates. She is a registrant of the British Psychoanalytic Council. She also lives in Ealing with fellow former actor Michael Maynard. They have one son.

References

English television actresses
English stage actresses
People from Colchester
English television presenters
BBC television presenters
1950 births
Living people
Alumni of the University of York